A Chaplain of His Holiness is a priest to whom the Pope has granted this title. They are addressed as Monsignor and have certain privileges with respect to ecclesiastical dress and vestments.

History

In accordance with the motu proprio Pontificalis Domus of 28 March 1968, those priests who had been called Supernumerary Privy Chamberlains continued to be part of the Papal Household, under the new name of Chaplains of His Holiness. Lower ranks of Privy Chamberlains (Honorary Chamberlains of Purple Robes, Chamberlains extra Urbem, Honorary Privy Chaplains, and Honorary Chaplains extra Urbem) were abolished, making Chaplain of His Holiness the first (lowest) of the three ranks of Monsignor.

The role of Chaplain of His Holiness dates to the time of Pope Urban VIII. Such Chaplains have provided unpaid service since the pontificate of Pope Pius VI. The nomination of candidates extra urbem may be granted at the request of their bishop through the Apostolic Nunciature, subject to the examination of the merits of the person considered for this rank and to the criteria of the Holy See. Once the candidate has passed all the requirements, a rescript is drawn up by the Secretariat of State attesting to their promotion to this ecclesiastical rank.

The following are chaplains of His Holiness as long as they are in office:
 The canons of the cathedrals of Lodi and Syracuse,
 The canons of the chapter of Saints Celse and Julian in Rome,
 The magistral chaplains of the Sovereign Order of Malta, SMOM,
 The clerics of the papal chapel,
 The canonical coadjutors of the great papal basilicas.

This rank does not expire but requires renewal upon the death of the pope who granted this rank.

See also
Honorary prelate
Protonotary apostolic

References